Pigeons is second album from Brooklyn-based indie rock band Here We Go Magic and was released via Secretly Canadian in June 2010.

Critical reception

Regarding Here We Go Magic's second album, Pitchfork wrote: "Luke Temple takes his Here We Go Magic project for a spin on the Autobahn and opens the throttle."
The BBC wrote "Redraw those best music of 2010 lists because Pigeons, the second album from HWGM, will be alighting somewhere near the top of them.” The San Diego City Beat called the album; "A varied record full of fast-paced riffs, layered vocals, electronic noises, ambient sounds and the steady lull of Temple’s croon."

Track listing

References

2010 albums
Here We Go Magic albums
Secretly Canadian albums